Sporza is a multimedia brand of Belgian public-service radio and television network VRT specifically for coverage of sporting events. These broadcasts are organized by the Flemish government and mainly financed with tax money.

Current rights

Belgium

International

External links

Sports divisions of TV channels
Dutch-language radio stations in Belgium
Radio stations established in 2004
2004 establishments in Belgium